"Punto G" (Spanish for "G Spot") is a song by Colombian singer-songwriter Karol G. It was written by Karol G, Andy Clay and Rayito, and produced by the latter two. The song was released on April 4, 2019 through Universal Music Latino, as the fourth single from her second studio album Ocean.

Background 
The song was first teased a month prior to its official release through Karol G's social media accounts, with snippets of the song, video and lyrics used in her captions. The song was officially announced a day prior to its release. The song was released on April 4, 2019.

Critical reception 
Rolling Stone stated: "Few reggaeton songs have championed the vagina as intimately as Karol G does in "Punto G" — opting to skip the graphic details, Karol masters the delicate art of sensual suggestion."

Commercial performance 
"Punto G" debuted at number 40 on the US Billboard Hot Latin Songs chart dated April 20, 2019. It charted for one week. On it's fifth week, the song entered and peaked at number 30 on the chart dated May 18, 2019.

Awards and nominations

Music video 
The music video for "Punto G" was directed by José-Emilio Sagaró and was released on Karol G's YouTube channel on April 4, 2019.

Charts

Weekly charts

Certifications

References 

2019 singles
Karol G songs